Maes Knoll (sometimes Maes tump or Maes Knoll tump) is an Iron Age hill fort in Somerset, England, located at the eastern end of the Dundry Down ridge, south of the city of Bristol and north of the village of Norton Malreward near the eastern side of Dundry Hill. It is a Scheduled Ancient Monument.

Background

Hill forts developed in the Late Bronze and Early Iron Age, roughly the start of the first millennium BC. The reason for their emergence in Britain, and their purpose, has been a subject of debate. It has been argued that they could have been military sites constructed in response to invasion from continental Europe, sites built by invaders, or a military reaction to social tensions caused by an increasing population and consequent pressure on agriculture. The dominant view since the 1960s has been that the increasing use of iron led to social changes in Britain. Deposits of iron ore were distant from the tin and copper ore necessary to make bronze, so that trading patterns shifted and the old elites lost their economic and social status. Power passed into the hands of a new group of people. Archaeologist Barry Cunliffe believes that population increase still played a role and has stated "[the forts] provided defensive possibilities for the community at those times when the stress [of an increasing population] burst out into open warfare. But I wouldn't see them as having been built because there was a state of war. They would be functional as defensive strongholds when there were tensions and undoubtedly some of them were attacked and destroyed, but this was not the only, or even the most significant, factor in their construction".

Description

From here, there are clear views north to Bristol, east to Bath and the Cotswold Hills, and south over Stanton Drew stone circles to Chew Valley Lake and the Mendip Hills. The underlying rocks are Inferior Oolite of the Jurassic period.

Early history

It is believed to have been built, around 250 BC, by the Dobuni who were one of the Celtic tribes living in the British Isles prior to the Roman invasion of Britain. The name Maes Knoll is derived from the Brythonic word maes meaning flat top, derived from Latin mensa meaning table, and Old English knoll or knowle meaning hill.

The pre-historic, later Wansdyke runs west from it along the north side of Dundry Hill and south-east from it.

Second World War

During the Second World War, a small, draughty, rectangular, corrugated-iron hut on the top of the tump sheltered two or more of Dundry's Home Guard, allowing them to spot enemy aircraft and potential parachute or glider invasions of Bristol. The modern outlines of the hut and a smaller, more-square area are both still discernible. Presumably, the tall trees to the north of the tump would have been cut down to allow clear visibility of Bristol.

The flat plateau immediately to the east of Maes Knoll had some 50 wartime stone cairns to deter enemy glider landings. The cairns continued to be there for some years after the war ended.

See also
List of hillforts and ancient settlements in Somerset

References

External links 
Illustrated description

Hill forts in Somerset
History of Somerset
Bath and North East Somerset
Neolithic settlements
Iron Age sites in England
Archaeological sites in Somerset
Scheduled monuments in Bath and North East Somerset